The Habt (Arabic: بلاد الهبط) is a historical and geographical region located in northwest Morocco.

Toponymy 
The place name « Habt » means « descent » and probably dates back to Idrisids.

Geography 
The Habt is characterized by the presence of plains and mountains. It comprises the plains of Rharb and Khlot and part of Jebala (mountain region).

Leo Africanus — diplomat and explorer of North Africa of 15th and 16th centuries — has described:

« Cette province prend son commencement au fleuve Guarga du côté du Midy et de celui de tramontane se termine à la mer océane; devers ponant confine avec les marets d'Azgar et de la partie du levant aux montagnes, qui sont sur le détroit des colonnes d'Hercule, ayant de longueur cent mille et octante en largeur. »

History 
The Habt was part, because of its promiscuity with the territory of al-Andalus, the first Arabized areas in Morocco.

According to Leo Africanus, a province of Habt (‘amalat al-Habt) was founded in the time of Wattassid. Two centuries later, under the Alaouites, the region of the Jebala and Faḥṣ (nāḥiyat Jbāla wa al-Faḥṣ) has supplanted administratively.

The Almohads installed a fraction of the Banu Hilal, a tribe of Najd, built in the 12th century to the Moroccan guich.

According to Ibn Khaldun —  historian of North Africa — has described:

« Les tribus de Djochem et de Rîah s'étant alors empressées de faire leur soumission, il les déporta dans le Maghreb-el-Acsa où il établit la première dans la province de Temsna, et la seconde dans le canton d'El-Hebet et dans les régions maritimes d'Azghar, province située entre Tanger et Salé. »

See also 
 Jebala (mountainous region, part of which is the Habt).
 Plains of Rharb (one of the plains Habt).
 Spanish protectorate in Morocco (Habt having been under the protectorate from 1912 to 1956).

References 

Regions of Morocco
Geography of Morocco